Brett Boylan (born 26 January 1971)  is an Australian Paralympic wheelchair rugby player. He was born in Sydney, New South Wales.  He participated in the Australian Stealers at the 1996, 2000 Sydney, and 2004 Athens Paralympics, winning a silver medal with the team in 2000.

References

Paralympic wheelchair rugby players of Australia
Wheelchair rugby players at the 1996 Summer Paralympics
Wheelchair rugby players at the 2000 Summer Paralympics
Wheelchair rugby players at the 2004 Summer Paralympics
Paralympic silver medalists for Australia
Living people
Medalists at the 2000 Summer Paralympics
1971 births
Paralympic medalists in wheelchair rugby